Alexi Salamone (born 17 June 1987 in Bryansk, Russia, Soviet Union) is a  Paralympian ice sledge hockey player from the United States.

Early life
Salamone was born near Chernobyl, the site of a nuclear accident that took place 14 months prior to his birth. He was born with deformed legs, both of which were amputated at the Children's Institute of Prosthetics in Moscow when he was four years old.  Orphaned, he was adopted by the Salamones, a couple from Buffalo, New York, and moved to the United States at the age of six.

Ice sledge hockey
Salamone was introduced to ice sports by the Skating Association for the Blind and Handicapped (S.A.B.A.H.). He has been a member of the U.S. national sledge hockey team since 2003, twice representing his country at the Winter Paralympics.

At the 2006 Winter Paralympics in Turin, Italy, Salamone was part of the American team that won the bronze medal. The United States featured in Group B of the tournament and won two of their three group games; 3–0 against Japan and 6–1 over Sweden. A 1–2 defeat in the match against Germany meant the USA faced Group A winners Norway in the semi-finals. The team lost that match 2–4 but went on to beat Germany 4–3 in the bronze medal match.

As a part of the United States national team he won a bronze medal at the 2008 IPC Ice Sledge Hockey World Championships, held in Marlborough, USA and won a gold medal at the 2009 Ice Sledge Hockey World Championships in Ostrava, Czech Republic.

In 2010 he competed at his second Winter Paralympics in Vancouver, where USA won gold. They beat Japan 2-0 in the final. Salamone scored the first goal in the final and overall had four goals and four assists in five matches.

He was not selected for the 2014 Paralympic Games.

References

External links 
 
 

1987 births
Living people
American sledge hockey players
Paralympic sledge hockey players of the United States
Paralympic gold medalists for the United States
Paralympic bronze medalists for the United States
Ice sledge hockey players at the 2006 Winter Paralympics
Ice sledge hockey players at the 2010 Winter Paralympics
Medalists at the 2006 Winter Paralympics
Medalists at the 2010 Winter Paralympics
Paralympic medalists in sledge hockey